Joel Simkhai (born c. 1976) is an Israeli-American tech entrepreneur. He is the founder and former CEO of geosocial networking and dating apps Grindr and Blendr. His original goal in starting Grindr was for people with similar interests to find new friends nearby.

In 2022, he launched a new dating app called Motto.

Life and career 
Simkhai was born in Tel Aviv, Israel. His mother was a jeweler, and his father was a diamond dealer. When he was three years old, his family moved to New York City. He received his Bachelor of Arts degree in International Relations & Economics from Tufts University in May 1998. After starting college, he came out to his parents and friends. He has two brothers, who are also gay.

After college, he worked in mergers and acquisitions.

While he started with little money or expertise and never expected Grindr to become international, he became a multimillionaire CEO of an app with millions of users worldwide. In January 2018, he left Grindr after the company was sold to the Chinese gaming company Beijing Kunlun Tech.

Simkhai is a charter member of the Young Presidents' Organization.

He owns several properties, primarily residing in New York. In 2021, Dave Keuning bought a mansion that Simkhai owned in Outpost Estates.

In 2022, Simkhai launched a new mobile app called MOTTO for the gay and queer community. The company is based in New York City.

References 

1970s births
Living people
American LGBT businesspeople
Israeli LGBT businesspeople
LGBT Jews
People from Tel Aviv
Tufts University alumni
Israeli businesspeople